The Grassalkovich Palace is a palace in Bratislava and the residence of the President of Slovakia. It is situated on Hodžovo námestie, near the Summer Archbishop's Palace. The building is a Rococo-late Baroque summer palace with a French garden.

History

The building was finished in 1760, by architect Anton Mayerhofer for Hungarian aristocrat Antal Grassalkovich, a close friend of Maria Theresa. It features many rooms and an impressive staircase. The chapel is decorated with frescoes by Joseph von Pichler. 

The building became a center of Baroque musical life in Pozsony. Joseph Haydn premiered some of his works here. Count Grassalkovich also had his orchestra and his "colleague",  Prince Esterházy, used to "lend" him his favorite conductor, Haydn. Grassalkovich was Maria Theresa's vassal, so the palace was used for various balls and parties of the Habsburg royal court. For example, it was Haydn who conducted the orchestra when Maria Theresa's daughter married Albert of Sachsen-Teschen, then governor of the Kingdom of Hungary (see Bratislava Castle). Ľudovít Štúr is said to have declared his love to Adela Ostrolúcka for the first time during a ball organized by Archduke Stephen Francis Victor (Buda 14 September 1817 – Menton 19 February 1867), son of the Palatine, Joseph. The last owners of the palace before the end of Austria-Hungary were Archduke Frederick of Teschen with his wife Isabella of Croy-Dülmen.

From 1919 the palace was occupied by the Territorial Military Command.

During the 1939–1945 period, the palace was adapted by Emil Belluš and became the seat of the President of the First Slovak Republic (i.e. of Jozef Tiso). During the Communist era, it was first (after 1945) the seat of the Council of Commissioners (also styled Corps of Plenipotentiaries), which was a quasi-government of Slovakia within Czechoslovakia. In 1950, the building was turned into the "Klement Gottwald House of Pioneers and Youth" (Dom pionierov a mládeže Klementa Gottwalda), which was an activity center for Bratislava's schoolchildren, all of whom were so-called pioneers at that time. The schoolchildren caused extensive damage to the palace, and the necessary restoration only became possible following the transition from Communism in late 1989 with the Velvet Revolution.

The restoration of Grassalkovich Palace during the early 1990s was overseen by the inaugural First Lady of Slovakia, Emília Kováčová. Following its restoration, the palace became the residence of Slovakia's president on 30 September 1996. Its once-large gardens are now a public park, complete with a statue of Bratislava-born composer Jan Nepomuk Hummel.

References

External links 

Palaces in Bratislava
Official residences in Slovakia
Presidential residences
Grassalkovich family
18th-century architecture in Slovakia
Houses completed in 1760
Baroque palaces in Slovakia
Rococo architecture in Slovakia